A brickyard is a place where bricks are made and/or stored.

The Brickyard may refer to:

 Brickyard (East Chicago), a former neighborhood in East Chicago, Indiana, US
 The Brickyard (NC State), a popular nickname for University Plaza at North Carolina State University
 The Brickyard (shopping mall), a shopping mall in Chicago, Illinois, US
 The Brickyard, a nickname for the Indianapolis Motor Speedway
 The Brickyard 400, a stock car race held there
 The Brickyard, a protected tourist attraction adjacent to Menemsha Hills in Massachusetts, US
 BRICKYARD, the callsign of Republic Airways